The Aprilia RS50 is a sport moped made by Aprilia. The model made until 2005 was powered by a single cylinder two-stroke aluminium cylinder block, liquid cooled  Motori-Minarelli AM6 engine. The new model, made since 2006, uses a single cylinder two-stroke aluminium cylinder block, liquid cooled  engine made by Derbi, the D50B0. The bike is popular in countries that have restrictions on motorcycle engine size at specific ages. This and other similar machines such as the Derbi GPR 50 and Yamaha TZR50 have also been popular choices as a more adult-sized option for MiniGP racing, which is otherwise more commonly participated in by riders of smaller bikes such as the Honda NSR50.

Notes

External links

RS120
Sport bikes
Two-stroke motorcycles